The Great Falls and Old Dominion Railroad (GF&OD) was an interurban trolley line that ran in Northern Virginia during the early 20th century.

History

Chartered in 1900 by a group of local landowners and acquired in 1902 by John Roll McLean (owner of The Washington Post) and Senator Stephen Benton Elkins, the 15-mile electrified railroad began operating from Georgetown in Washington, D.C., in 1906. The first scheduled car reached Great Falls Park in Fairfax County, Virginia, on July 3 of that year.

From Georgetown, the railroad crossed the Potomac River on a superstructure built on the upstream side of the old Aqueduct Bridge to Rosslyn in Arlington, where it made connections with an older electric trolley line, the Washington, Arlington & Falls Church Railway (see Northern Virginia trolleys). From Rosslyn, the railroad traveled northwest along the north side of Lee Highway (now part of U.S. Route 29) to Cherrydale and then on its own right-of-way (now Old Dominion Drive, Virginia State Route 309) in Arlington and Fairfax Counties through forests, farmland and fruit orchards, bypassing the existing villages of Lewinsville and Langley. At Great Falls, the GF&OD constructed a trolley park, which became a popular destination.

The owners gave their own names to two stations located at the railroad's crossings of major roads: McLean Station at Chain Bridge Road (Virginia State Route 123)  and Elkins Station at Old Georgetown Pike (Virginia State Route 193). The station at Chain Bridge Road became a focus for development that evolved into the community of McLean, Virginia.

In 1911, McLean and Elkins incorporated the Washington & Old Dominion Railway (W&OD). In 1912, the Georgetown-Great Falls line became the Great Falls Division of the W&OD, sharing trackage with the W&OD's Bluemont Division between Rosslyn and Thrifton Junction. In 1935, Fairfax and Arlington counties obtained the right-of-way west of Thrifton Junction in settlement of delinquent taxes. Most of the right-of-way was converted into Old Dominion Drive.

Interstate 66, the Custis Trail, and Lee Highway were built on the former GF&OD roadbed between Rosslyn and Thrifton Junction.

Stations 

The stations on the Great Falls Division of the W&OD (with locations of sites in 2008) were:

Maps

W&OD Railway system maps

Topographic Maps
 1915 topographic map of northwestern Fairfax County, showing the route of the W&OD Railway's Great Falls Division (Electric RR) between Difficult Run and Great Falls: 
 1915 topographic map of Washington, D.C., the city of Alexandria, Alexandria County, Falls Church and northeastern Fairfax County, showing the route of the W&OD Railway's Great Falls Division between Georgetown and Great Falls: 
 1917 topographic map of Washington, D.C., the city of Alexandria, Alexandria County, Falls Church and northeastern Fairfax County, showing the route of the W&OD Railway's Great Falls Division between Georgetown and Great Falls: 
 1929 topographic map of Washington, D.C., the city of Alexandria, Alexandria County, Falls Church and northeastern Fairfax County, showing the routes of the W&OD Railway's Great Falls Division between Rosslyn and Great Falls:

See also 
 Northern Virginia Trolleys
 Washington and Old Dominion Railroad

Notes

References 
 In Appendix K of Northern Virginia Regional Park Authority - Pre-filed Direct Testimony of Mr. Hafner, Mr. Mcray and Mr. Simmons, November 30, 2005 (Part 5), Case No. PUE-2005-00018, Virginia State Corporation Commission. Obtained in

Further reading 
 

 King, W.E. (1934-07-19).  Index map showing Washington & Old Dominion Railway's line abandoned in relation to other railroads and common carriers in lower left corner of

External links 
 
  Photographs of stations, tickets and promotional materials about the Great Falls and Old Dominion Railroad and the Great Falls Division of the Washington & Old Dominion Railway. 
 
  In  Map shows stations and route of Great Falls Division of W&OD (former route of GF&OD).
 (10:32 minutes)

Defunct Virginia railroads
Defunct Washington, D.C., railroads
Streetcars in Virginia
Streetcars in Washington, D.C.
Transportation in Arlington County, Virginia
Transportation in Fairfax County, Virginia
Electric railways in Virginia
Electric railways in Washington, D.C.
Interurban railways in Virginia
Interurban railways in Washington, D.C.